A list of windmills in Antwerp Province, Belgium.

Notes
Bold indicates a mill that is still standing. Italics indicates a mill with some remains surviving.

Buildings and structures in Antwerp Province
Tourist attractions in Antwerp Province
Antwerp